Meade County is a county located in the U.S. state of Kentucky. As of the 2020 census, the population was 30,003. Its county seat is Brandenburg. The county was founded December 17, 1823, and named for Captain James M. Meade, who was killed in action at the Battle of River Raisin during the War of 1812. Meade County is part of the Elizabethtown-Fort Knox, KY Metropolitan Statistical Area, which is included in the Louisville/Jefferson County-Elizabethtown-Madison, KY-IN Combined Statistical Area.

Geography

All  of the county's northern border faces Indiana, across from the Ohio River.

Outdoor attractions
 Doe Run Inn
 Otter Creek Outdoor Recreation Area
 Meade Olin Park
 Diana’s Park
 Park Down By The River

Adjacent counties
 Hardin County  (southeast)
 Breckinridge County  (southwest/CST Border)
 Harrison County, Indiana  (northeast)
 Perry County, Indiana  (northwest/CST Border)
 Crawford County, Indiana  (north)

Transportation
The Regional planning group One Knox considers the largest road projects needed to support the growth from the BRAC realignment at Fort Knox to include extending Kentucky Route 313 to US 60 in Meade County and then into Brandenburg creating a corridor between Radcliff and Elizabethtown running parallel to U.S. Route 31W (Dixie Highway), and building a new extension from Bullion Boulevard in Fort Knox to KY 313 in Radcliff. The group estimates that buying the right of way for the KY 313 project to Brandenburg would cost nearly $30 million. The realignment at Fort Knox is projected to bring thousands of workers and jobs, along with millions of dollars into the regions economy.
 The Matthew E. Welsh Bridge connects Meade County to Harrison County, Indiana over the Ohio River.
 KY 1638 connects Brandenburg, Kentucky to US 31W (Dixie Highway) in Muldraugh, Kentucky which connects to Louisville, Kentucky.

Demographics

As of the census of 2000, there were 26,349 people, 9,470 households, and 7,396 families residing in the county. The racial makeup of the county was 92.37% White, 4.13% Black or African American, 0.59% Native American, 0.53% Asian, 0.13% Pacific Islander, 0.83% from other races, and 1.43% from two or more races.  2.15% of the population were Hispanic or Latino of any race.

There were 9,470 households, out of which 42.20% had children under the age of 18 living with them, 64.10% were married couples living together, 9.70% had a female householder with no husband present, and 21.90% were non-families. Of all households 18.40% were made up of individuals, and 6.50% had someone living alone who was 65 years of age or older.  The average household size was 2.77 and the average family size was 3.15.

In the county, the population was spread out, with 29.80% under the age of 18, 9.10% from 18 to 24, 32.70% from 25 to 44, 20.30% from 45 to 64, and 8.10% who were 65 years of age or older.  The median age was 32 years. For every 100 females, there were 100.40 males.  For every 100 females age 18 and over, there were 98.30 males.

The median income for a household in the county was $36,966, and the median income for a family was $40,592. Males had a median income of $30,835 versus $22,038 for females. The per capita income for the county was $16,000.  About 9.30% of families and 11.30% of the population were below the poverty line, including 13.80% of those under age 18 and 12.30% of those age 65 or over.

Communities

Cities
 Brandenburg (county seat)
 Ekron
 Muldraugh

Census-designated places
 Doe Valley
 Fort Knox, a military base (partly in Hardin County)

Other unincorporated places
 Battletown
 Big Spring (partly in Breckinridge County in the Central Time Zone and Hardin County in the Eastern Time Zone)
 Concordia
 Flaherty
 Garrett
 Guston
 Lickskillet
 Midway
 Payneville
 Rhodelia
 Rock Haven
 Wolf Creek
  Garnettsville
 Buck Grove

Politics

Education
Most of the county is zoned to Meade County Schools, which operates Meade County High School.

However people living on Fort Knox are instead zoned to the Department of Defense Education Activity (DoDEA), which operates Fort Knox Middle High School.

See also

 National Register of Historic Places listings in Meade County, Kentucky

References

External links
 Meade County Local 
"Ky-313 extension is well under way"—The News-Enterprise, July 24, 2011
 Meade County Fiscal Court & Meade County Tourism
 Meade County Chamber of Commerce

 
1823 establishments in Kentucky
Kentucky counties on the Ohio River
Kentucky counties
Louisville metropolitan area
Populated places established in 1823